Osokorky is a station of Kyiv Metro's Syretsko-Pecherska Line. It is situated between Slavutych and Pozniaky stations. This station was opened on 30 December 1992.

The station was designed by architect Krushynskyi. Osokorky station has 2 entrances. This station is situated in the crossing of Mykoly Bazhana Avenue and Dniprovska Naberezhna in the Osokorky masyv (neighborhood).

Osokorky station operates from 05:35 to 00:06.

References

Kyiv Metro stations
Railway stations opened in 1992
1982 establishments in Ukraine